"Wall of Shame" is a phrase that is most commonly associated with the Berlin Wall.  In this context, the phrase was coined by Willy Brandt, and it was used by the government of West Berlin, and later popularized in the English-speaking world and elsewhere from the beginning of the 1960s.  Inspired by its usage in reference to the Berlin Wall, the term has later been used more widely.

For example, the term "Wall of Shame" can be applied to things, including physical barriers (walls, fences, etc.) serving dishonourable or disputed separation purposes (like the Berlin Wall and the American border wall), physical and virtual bulletin boards listing names or images for purposes of shaming, and even lists in print (i.e., walls of text naming people, companies, etc. for the purpose of shaming them, or as record of embarrassment).

Additionally, "Wall of Shame" may be a significant part in the building of a "Hall of Shame", although, more often, a "Wall of Shame" is a monument in its own right (i.e., a wall not having been erected as part of any "Hall of Shame" endeavour). More recently, the term "Wall of Shame" has been used in reference to the Mexico–United States barrier, the Egypt–Gaza barrier and the Israeli West Bank barrier.

Applied to Japanese culture
The earliest use of the term, which is a translation of a Japanese phrase, may have been by Ruth Benedict, in her influential book, The Chrysanthemum and the Sword (1948), and other anthropologists discussing the honor shame culture of Japan.

Applied to the Berlin Wall

The term was used by the government of West Berlin to refer to the Berlin Wall, which surrounded West Berlin and separated it from East Berlin and the GDR. In 1961, the government of East Germany named the erected wall as the "Anti-Fascist Protection Rampart", a part of the inner German border; many Berliners, however, called it "Schandmauer" ("Wall of Shame").

The term was coined by governing mayor Willy Brandt. Outside Germany it first appeared as "Wall of Shame" in a cover story published by TIME in 1962, and President of the United States John F. Kennedy used the term in his Annual Message to the US Congress on the State of the Union, 14 January 1963. Often, graffiti would be painted on points, where a street would intersect with the wall, often reading, "Road blocked by Wall of Shame".

The Berlin Wall was referred to as the "Wall of Shame" in many more recent notable contexts, such as:
 The academic article, "The Democratic Invention", by Mário Soares, former Prime Minister and later President of Portugal (1986–1996)
 The "Our Europe" speech by Jacques Chirac, President of France, to the Bundestag, 27 June 2000
 A speech in 2002 by Romano Prodi, Prime Minister of Italy and former President of the European Commission

Other uses
 In 1998, UNIFEM organized a photo exhibit at the United Nations that contrasted a "wall of shame", focusing on women's plight and suffering, with a "wall of hope", showcasing initiatives to end violence against women.
 An academic paper by M. Lachance (York University) talks about the Quebec "wall of shame".
 Peru's "Wall of Shame", a ten foot high wall outside Lima, separating San Juan de Miraflores and Surco.
 The 2016 separation wall around the Ain al-Hilweh camp in Lebanon, intended to separate the local Palestinian-Lebanese population from the surrounding society.
 The Egypt–Gaza barrier
 The Israeli West Bank barrier
 The Mexico–United States barrier

See also 
 The Shame

References

Walls
Berlin Wall
Separation barriers
1960s neologisms
Political metaphors

es:Muro de la Vergüenza